Husby Court District, or Husby tingslag, was a district of Dalarna in Sweden. The court district (tingslag) served as the basic division of the rural areas in Dalarna, except for one district that was a hundred (härad). The entire province had once been a single hundred, called Dala hundare.

See also
 Husby, Hedemora

Subdivisions of Sweden
Dalarna